Lukáš Kyselica (born 16 September 1993 in Trenčín) is a Slovak football player.

Career 
The midfielder played for FK Slovan Nemšová,  and in the Corgoň Liga for AS Trenčín.

In Summer 2015 joined English non league (Toolstation Western League) side Wells City F.C.

References

1993 births
Living people
Slovak footballers
Association football midfielders
AS Trenčín players
Slovak Super Liga players
Expatriate footballers in England
Sportspeople from Trenčín
Slovak expatriate sportspeople in England
Slovak expatriate footballers